Glendower House (or Glyndŵr House), Glendower Street, Monmouth, Wales, is a Victorian former Congregational chapel constructed in a Classical style. The Royal Commission on the Ancient and Historical Monuments of Wales describes it as "a chapel of exceptional sophistication and elaboration of design and one of the earliest Italianate chapels in Wales".  It is named after Prince Owain Glyndŵr.

History
The Congregationalists had been worshipping in Dixton Gate until 1822 when they moved to St Mary Street to the building now known as Dyffryn House. In 1844 they moved again to Glendower Street. This was the wealthiest congregation in the town and in the latter half of the 19th century took a leading role in social and cultural activities, such as the eisteddfod. In addition to the facade, the attractions of the building include several fine coloured memorial windows by the Camm Brothers of Smethwick.

The building was constructed in 1843/44 to the design of architect William Armstrong of Bristol.  The central bay is defined by giant Corinthian columns in antis.  The design is a smaller version of that for the Brunswick Chapel in Bristol, which Armstrong had also designed. The building was listed at Grade II* on 27 October 1965 and, after near-complete dereliction, was converted into a private house in 2002. Its owner, Anthony Sully, was awarded a substantial grant by Cadw for the conversion, which he designed himself. The project featured on three UK television programmes and won a Civic Trust for Wales award in 2003–4.

Notes

References

External links
 

Congregational churches in Wales
Grade II* listed buildings in Monmouthshire
History of Monmouth, Wales
Buildings and structures in Monmouth, Wales
Former churches in Wales